Kirkeby may refer to:

People with the surname
Arnold Kirkeby (1901–1962), American hotelier and real estate investor
Ed Kirkeby (1891–1978), American musician and manager
Gilbert Kirkeby, MP
Ingunn Rise Kirkeby (born 1961), Norwegian handball player
Ivar Kirkeby-Garstad (1877–1951), Norwegian politician
John Kirkeby, English cleric in the 15th century
Lars Reidulv Kirkeby-Garstad (1907–1977), Norwegian politician
Mark Kirkeby (born 1960), American politician
Ole Fogh Kirkeby (born 1947), Danish philosopher
Paula Kirkeby (1934–2016), American art gallery owner, art collector, fine art printing press owner and director
Per Kirkeby (1938–2018), Danish painter
William de Kirkeby, English cleric in the 13th century

Other
Kirkeby, Denmark, town
Kirkeby–Over Stadium, a stadium in South Dakota, US
Sønder Kirkeby Runestone, ancient stone